Shahhat  is a town in the District of Jabal al Akhdar in north-eastern Libya. Cyrene was located in the same area in ancient times.

Shahhat is linked with Derna by two roads, the inner one running through Al Qubah is part of the Libyan Coastal Highway and the coastal one running through Susa and Ras al Helal.

During the Libyan Civil War, the city was one of the first to fall under rebel control.

See also
 List of cities in Libya

References

External links
Satellite map at Maplandia.

Populated places in Jabal al Akhdar